MacArthur Park (originally Westlake Park) is a park dating back to the late 19th century in the Westlake neighborhood of Los Angeles. In the early 1940s, it was renamed after General Douglas MacArthur, and later designated City of Los Angeles Historic Cultural Monument #100.

The lake in MacArthur Park is fed by natural springs (although an artificial bottom to the lake was laid during the construction of the Red Line, opened in 1993). In the past, a fountain with a reflecting pool on the northern end was also fed by the springs. The Westlake/MacArthur Park B and D Line station is across the street.

Description 
The park is divided in two by Wilshire Boulevard. The southern portion primarily consists of a lake, while the northern half includes an amphitheatre, bandshell, soccer fields, and children's playground, along with a recreation center operated by the City of Los Angeles Department of Recreation and Parks. The bandshell was once home to many organizations and events, such as Jugaremos en Familia (a live event hosted by Memo Flores for the Hispanic community).

Public artworks installed in the park have included the MacArthur Monument, Entry Arch, General Harrison Gray Otis, the Hungarian Freedom Fighters Memorial, MacArthur Park Singularity, Mine Was the Better Punch, But It Didn't Win the Wristwatch, and Prometheus Bringing Fire to Earth. Previously, the statue of Charles III of Spain was installed in the park.

History 

The park, originally named Westlake Park, was built in the 1880s, along with a similar Eastlake Park, whose lake is artificial, in Los Angeles. Westlake Park was renamed May 7, 1942; Eastlake Park was renamed Lincoln Park. Both Westlake and Eastlake (as well as Echo Park) were built as drinking water reservoirs connected to the city's system, Zanja Madre. When the city abandoned the non-pressurized zanja system for a pressurized pipe system, these smaller, shallow reservoirs located at low points no longer provided much benefit and were converted into parks.

The park was named for Henricus Wallace Westlake, a Canadian physician who had moved to Los Angeles around 1888, settled in the area and donated a portion of his property to the city for a park.

In the mid-19th century the area was a swampland; by the 1890s, it was a vacation destination, surrounded by luxury hotels. In the early part of the 20th century, the Westlake neighborhood became known as the Champs-Élysées of Los Angeles.

Wilshire Boulevard formerly ended at the lake, but in 1934 a berm was built for it to cross and link up with the existing Orange Street (which ran from Alvarado to Figueroa Streets) into downtown Los Angeles. Orange Street was renamed Wilshire and extended east of Figueroa Street to Grand Avenue. This divided the lake into two halves; the northern one was subsequently drained. From the 1940s, the lake featured the rental of electric boats, with the names of comic book animal characters.

According to a Los Angeles Times news story from 1956, two swans, named Rudie and Susie, hatched their five new cygnets on the island in MacArthur Park Lake, and according to the park superintendent, these were the first swans born in the park in over a decade.

For many years, Filipino World War II veterans protested in the park named after their former commander regarding promises made when they enlisted that the United States had reneged on. In 2009 as part of the stimulus package, Congress awarded lump-sum payments of $15,000 to Filipino veterans who are American citizens and $9,000 to those who are noncitizens.

MacArthur Park became known for violence after 1985 when prostitution, drug dealing, shoot-outs, and the occasional rumored drowning became commonplace, with as many as 30 murders in 1990. When the lake was drained in 1973 and 1978, hundreds of handguns and other firearms were found disposed of in the lake.

May Day Mêlée with the Los Angeles Police Department 

Two May Day rallies calling for US citizenship for undocumented immigrants were held at MacArthur Park on May 1, 2007. When the protest overflowed onto city streets, police drove motorcycles through the crowd, then ordered the crowd to disperse. Some people began throwing plastic bottles and rocks at officers. Members of the Los Angeles Police Department then used batons and rubber bullets in a manner later found by the LAPD's own investigation, as well as by the courts, to be excessive. After community mobilization, pressure from the Mayor, and an extensive internal review, LAPD Chief William Bratton apologized, the commanding officer was demoted, seventeen other officers faced penalties, and the LAPD paid more than $13 million in damages.

Redevelopment 

Beginning in 2002, the Los Angeles Police Department and business and community leaders led a redevelopment effort that has led to the installation of surveillance cameras, the opening of a recreation center, increased business, early-morning drink vendors, a new Metro station, the return of the paddle boats and the fountain, and large community festivals attracting thousands. Along with determined campaigns to improve community relations between the neighborhood and the police, crime rates went down through the mid-2000s.

In 2007, Levitt Pavilion Los Angeles opened, offering 50 free concerts each summer and attracting a wide range of audiences from around the country and globally. Currently programmed & produced (as of 2017) by local resident Matthew Himes, notable acts that have performed include Celso Pina, Fishbone, Bomba Estereo, La Sonora Dinamita, Jimmy Webb, Kinky, La Resistencia, Nortec Collective and many more. In the same year, the paddle boats returned. They were available for rent on the weekends in 2009. By early 2010, the boathouse was closed. Eventually, the paddle boats were removed. The boathouse was demolished in 2014.

The MacArthur Park bandshell was painted by local artists and graffiti artists under the direction of Otis Parsons. Some of the artists involved were: Robert Williams, Skill, John "Zender" Estrada, Hector "Hex" Rios, Geo, Exit, Trip, Hate Prime, Relic, Galo "MAKE" Canote, RickOne and others. Some of the artwork was featured in the book Spraycan Art by Henry Chalfant and Jim Prigoff.

The lakeside portion of the park would be temporarily close for 10 weeks beginning on October 15, 2021.

Crime 
The area surrounding MacArthur Park, one of the poorest areas of Los Angeles, has widely reported crime rates. Considered to be MS-13 territory, many poorer locals of the area, especially those doing illicit business in the park, are forced to pay a "tax" to the gang in exchange for being left alone. In 2021, multiple attacks on transgender sex workers in the park had led to increased police presence and were widely reported.

In popular culture 
MacArthur Park has been used as a filming location numerous times. In Hard Luck (1921) Buster Keaton eludes the police by posing with a statue in the park.  In  A Woman of Paris (1923) Charles Chaplin uses the north side of the park and the Ansonia in two scenes. MacArthur Park/Westlake Park and its boats figure prominently as the scene of a murder in the 1949 film noir Killer Bait (also known as Too Late for Tears) with Lizabeth Scott, Don DeFore, Dan Duryea and Arthur Kennedy. In 1973 'The Phantom of Herald Square' an episode of the t.v horror anthology series 'Circle of Fear' included a significant number of scenes filmed within the park.  A scene from the 1977 TV movie The Amazing Spider-Man was filmed here.  A scene from the television series Dragnet features MacArthur Park in 1967 titled "The Bank Examiner Swindle." In the episode of The Fresh Prince Of Bel-air "72 Hours", Carlton Banks plans to conduct illegal sales of counterfeit merchandise in the park, hoping to prove his street cred to Will and his friends.

In the movie Training Day, Jake stops two drug addicts from raping a 14-year-old girl near MacArthur Park. MacArthur Park was also featured in the 2001 Sundance film MacArthur Park. MacArthur Park was prominently featured in the 1997 film Volcano, as well as the 2005 film Kiss Kiss Bang Bang. MacArthur Park is featured in the critically acclaimed 2011 film Drive. In the Gym Class Heroes music video for Cupid's Chokehold (the As Cruel as School Children version) directed by Alan Ferguson, Travis McCoy and fictitious girlfriend Katy Perry meet in MacArthur Park along with dancing cupids. In the film Havoc, Allison meets Hector in MacArthur Park the afternoon before she is arrested. MacArthur Park is featured in Lorde's 2017 music video for Green Light.

Other films include The Nickel Ride with Jason Miller, Private Parts (1972), Going Ape! with Tony Danza, Murphy's Law with Charles Bronson, The Hidden with Kyle McLaughlan, A Patch of Blue with Sidney Poitier, and The Bigamist with Ida Lupino.

In MacArthur Park (1976) was written and directed by Bruce Schwartz.

The 1968 hit song "MacArthur Park," written by Jimmy Webb and originally recorded by Richard Harris and later covered by Donna Summer, was inspired by this location.

In an episode of "Curb your Enthusiasm", the park is humorously suggested as a place to visit by a hotel concierge performed by Bill Hader.

See also

List of parks in Los Angeles
List of places named for Douglas MacArthur
MacArthur Park (song)
Statue of Óscar Romero

References

External links 

Government

General information
Levitt Pavilion Los Angeles (MacArthur Park)

Parks in Los Angeles
Los Angeles Historic-Cultural Monuments
Park (Los Angeles)
Westlake, Los Angeles
Wilshire Boulevard